Batn al-Hawa is a residential neighborhood inside the village of Silwan, which is located south of the al-Aqsa Mosque, outside the walls of the Old City of Jerusalem. The neighborhood or Mount Batn al-Hawa, which is an extension of the Mount of Olives, and is located in the eastern corner of Jerusalem; It is separated from it by the Silwan Valley, which connects to the Kidron Valley at the same point, and is known by the Jews as "Har Hashishit" or "The Flood Mountain.

History

In 1881–82, a group of Jews arrived in Jerusalem coming from Yemen as a result of messianic fervor. The year had special meaning to them, for which some thirty Yemenite Jewish families set out from Sana'a for the Holy Land. It was an arduous journey that took them over half a year to reach Jerusalem, where they arrived destitute of all things. Upon reaching Jerusalem, they sought shelter in the caves and grottoes in the hills facing Jerusalem's walls and Wadi Hilweh, while others moved to Jaffa. Initially shunned by the Jews of the Old Yishuv, who did not recognize them as Jews due to their dark complexions, unfamiliar customs, and strange pronunciation of Hebrew, they had to be given shelter by the Christians of the Swedish-American colony, who called them Gadites. Eventually, to end their reliance on Christian charity, Jewish philanthropists purchased land in the Silwan valley to establish a neighbourhood for them. Between 1885–91, 45 new stone houses were built for the Yemenites at the south end of the Arab village, built for them by a Jewish charity called Ezrat Niddahim. Up to 200 Yemenite Jews lived in the newly built neighbourhood, called Kfar Hashiloach (lit.: Siloam Village) or the "Yemenite Village." The neighbourhood included a place of worship now known as the Old Yemenite Synagogue. Construction costs were kept low by using the Shiloah spring as a water source instead of digging cisterns. An early 20th-century travel guide writes: In the "village of Silwan, east of Kidron ... some of the fellah dwellings [are] old sepulchers hewn in the rocks. During late years a great extension of the village southward has sprung up, owing to the settlement here of a colony of poor Jews from Yemen, etc. many of whom have built homes on the steep hillside just above and east of Bir Eyyub."

By 1910, the Yemenite Jewish community in Jerusalem and in Silwan purchased on credit a parcel of ground on the Mount of Olives for burying their dead, through the good agencies of Albert Antébi and with the assistance of the philanthropist, Baron Edmond Rothschild. The next year, the community was coerced into buying its adjacent property, by insistence of the mukhtar (headman) of the village Silwan, and which considerably added to their holdings.

Displacement of Palestinians
After occupying this village in 1967, Israel confiscated more than 73 thousand dunums of its lands for the purpose of establishing settlements there. Settlement began in the town of Silwan with two outposts in the Batn al-Hawa neighborhood in 2004, to which a police station was added to guard, and in 2017 the number increased to thirty Jewish families.
The Israeli authorities are planning a massive ethnic displacement operation in the Batn al-Hawa neighborhood, with the aim of judaizing the town of Silwan, where the Israeli authorities intend to issue a decision to displace Palestinian families.

18 households (108 people) in the neighborhood are subject of eviction orders issued against them in favor of Ataret Cohanim. The Jewish Benvenisti  Trust claim ownership of 5.2 dunums of land, that they say was used to settle Yemenite Jews in the late nineteenth century but who later left Palestine in 1929, during the Palestinian uprising. They premise their claim on a property deed from the Ottoman rule period. In 2002, the Custodian General transferred the land to the Benvenisti Trust, whose management is now in the hands of Ateret Cohanim. The decision was sanctioned by the Jerusalem District Court. The transfer was done without informing the Palestinian residents who have lived on the land since the 1950s, and who have contracts proving so.

Ateret Cohanim has filed eviction orders against the Palestinian families.  The  Palestinian  residents  filed  a  petition  with  the  Israeli  High Court to contest the evictions in 2017 in which they argue that under Ottoman law that applied at the time, the ownership applies only to the buildings, which do not exist anymore, but not the land  itself. In  June  2018  the  Israeli  government  acknowledged  that  the  Israeli  Custodian General’s transfer of the land to the Benvenisti Trust was done without investigating the nature of the Trust, Ottoman laws at the time, or the existing buildings. Yet, the Israeli High Court on 21 November 2018, rejected the appeals of the families, paving the way for the settler group Ateret Cohanim to continue legal proceedings to evict 81 Palestinian families, numbering approximately 436 individuals.

A ruling handed down by the Jerusalem Magistrates Court in January 2020 gave a substantial boost to efforts by the settler organization Ateret Cohanim to evict large numbers of Palestinians in Silwan from their homes. The organization managed to take over control of an Ottoman era (19th century) Jewish trust, called the Benvenisti Trust after Rabbi Moshe Benvenisti, and claims that land in areas of Silwan, such as the Batan al-Hawa neighborhood, was 'sacred religious land' and that Palestinians residing on this trust land were illegal squatters. The decisions are thought to effectively threaten with displacement some 700 Palestinians in Silwan.

Eighty per  cent  of residents are refugees once again at risk of displacement. Since 2015, 14 families have already been evicted. Ateret Cohanim now controls six buildings  comprising 27 housing units, the majority of which had been home to Palestinian families.

In June, 2021 a plan by Ateret Cohanim to build a heritage center for Yemenite Jewry in the synagogue has been frozen by the Jerusalem Affairs Ministry following an investigation by the religious trusts registry into the Benvenisti Trust in response to a petition by the Ir Amim organization which alleged that the trust was a shell organization run by Ateret Cohanim for its own purposes and another petition arguing the impropriety of the state financing a heritage center on private property.

On October 25, 2021, the Supreme Court held a hearing on a leave to appeal request by the Duweik family (five households), adjourned with no verdict and will rule in due course. On July 21, 2022, the Court ruled that the case be returned to the Magistrate’s Court and the General Custodian be included in the hearing. Therefore the eviction has been prevented for the time being.

References 

Arab neighborhoods in Jerusalem